Below is a list of awards received by Twins since they were formed in 2001 as a cantopop girl group. They average to receive about 2-3 awards in each Hong Kong music awards.  Their major accomplishment is in 2007 when they received the Asia Pacific Most Popular Female Artist Award from Jade Solid Gold Top 10 Awards.

Because of the Edison Chen photo scandal in 2008, Gillian took a short leave from the group. And thus the group did not record any songs or receive any awards between March 2008 to 2009.

Commercial Radio Hong Kong Ultimate Song Chart Awards
The Ultimate Song Chart Awards Presentation (叱咤樂壇流行榜頒獎典禮) is a cantopop award ceremony from one of the famous channel in Commercial Radio Hong Kong known as Ultimate 903 (FM 90.3).  Unlike other cantopop award ceremonies, this one is judged based on the popularity of the song/artist on the actual radio show.

Global Chinese Music Awards

IFPI Hong Kong Sales Awards
IFPI Awards is given to artists base on the sales in Hong Kong at the end of the year.

Jade Solid Gold Top 10 Awards
The Jade Solid Gold Songs Awards Ceremony(十大勁歌金曲頒獎典禮) is held annually in Hong Kong since 1984.  The awards are based on Jade Solid Gold show on TVB.

Metro Radio Mandarin Music Awards

Metro Showbiz Hit Awards
The Metro Showbiz Hit Awards (新城勁爆頒獎禮) is held in Hong Kong annually by Metro Showbiz radio station.  It focus mostly in cantopop music.

RTHK Top 10 Gold Songs Awards
The RTHK Top 10 Gold Songs Awards Ceremony(十大中文金曲頒獎音樂會) is held annually in Hong Kong since 1978.  The awards are determined by Radio and Television Hong Kong based on the work of all Asian artists (mostly cantopop) for the previous year.

Sprite Music Awards
The Sprite Music Awards Ceremony is an annual event given by Sprite China for work artists performed in previous years; awards received on 2008 are actually for the work and accomplishment for 2007.

References

Lists of awards received by Hong Kong musician
Lists of awards received by musical group